Adebayo Ismail Adewusi  (born May 20, 1958) is a Nigerian academic, lawyer, public administrator, politician and twice as former Commissioner in Lagos state. He was appointed commissioner for Finance between the year 2004 to 2006 and later as commissioner for Budget and Planning. He was also a governorship aspirant in Oyo State, Nigeria. In December 2019,  Adewusi succeeded Barrister Bisi Adegbuyi as the Postmaster General and CEO of Nigerian Postal Service (NIPOST) by the administration of President Muhammadu Buhari

Early life and education 
Adewusi hails from Eruwa in Ibarapa East Local Government Area of Oyo State. He was born on May 20, 1958 to the family of Pa Kareem Babatunde Adewusi and Madam Faderera Asabi Adewusi, in Anko Eruwa. His father who was a peasant farmer and traditional drummer.  He attended Baptist Secondary Modern School in Eruwa and earned his West African School Certificate at the Technical College, lle-Ife, Osun State. He studied Computer Science at The Polytechnic, Ibadan before proceeding to the University of Ife and graduated with a First Class Honours in Economics. He also had his M.Sc. from the same university. He obtained his PhD in International Monetary Economics from the Keio University Tokyo in 1993, as a Monbusho Scholar.
He also had a LLB degree from the University of Lagos in 2000.

Career 
Adewusi started his career as an Assistant Lecturer at the Obafemi Awolowo University after his Master's degree before proceeding for his PhD in Japan. After his doctorate, he worked at Lead Merchant Bank Limited between 1994 and 2000. He also served as Managing Director /CEO of Ibile Holdings Ltd. (an Investment Company owned by the Government of Lagos State) from 2000 to 2004. He was the Commissioner for Finance, Budget and Economic Planning in Lagos State between 2004  and 2006. He was also the chairman of Wemabod, a company established by the Western Regional Government led by the late Chief Obafemi Awolowo to provide accommodation in Lagos. He was a member of the APC in Oyo State in May 2018.

Projects

Nigerian Postcode Ecosystem and Infrastructure 
The Nigerian Postcode Ecosystem and Infrastructure is a project consummated by Nigerian Post Service in partnership with the National Space Research and Development Agency (NASRDA) to enhance postal service delivery in the country. The project infused the newly created standard postcode by NIPOST and the use of satellite imagery of high dimension through the national mapping network from NASRDA. Adewusi led NIPOST to the signing of the Memorandum of Understanding for the execution of the project in Nigeria.

References

External links



1958 births
Living people
People from Oyo State
20th-century Nigerian economists
Harvard Business School alumni
University of Lagos alumni
Obafemi Awolowo University alumni
The Polytechnic, Ibadan alumni
Keio University alumni
Commissioners of ministries of Lagos State
Pan-Atlantic University alumni
Academic staff of Obafemi Awolowo University
21st-century Nigerian economists